Park Min-young (born March 4, 1986) is a South Korean actress. She rose to fame in the historical coming-of-age drama Sungkyunkwan Scandal  (2010) and has since starred in television series City Hunter (2011),  Glory Jane (2011), Dr. Jin (2012), A New Leaf (2014), Healer (2014–2015), Remember (2015–2016), Queen for Seven Days (2017), What's Wrong with Secretary Kim (2018), Her Private Life (2019), When the Weather Is Fine (2020), and Forecasting Love and Weather (2022).

Education
In February 2013, Park graduated from Dongguk University in Seoul with a degree in Theatre.

Career

2005–2009: Beginnings
Park made her entertainment debut in a SK Telecom commercial in 2005. She launched her acting career a year later in the hit sitcom High Kick! (2006). She continued to appear in television dramas, in roles such as the only daughter of a notorious gangster in I Am Sam (2007), and a gumiho (nine-tailed fox in Korean mythology) in an episode of horror-themed drama Hometown of Legends (2008), She played a villainous princess in the period drama Ja Myung Go (2009), and a girl caught between two marathon runners in Running, Gu (2010). In 2008, She was featured in BigBang's hit song Haru Haru where she played the girlfriend of G-Dragon.

2010–2011: Breakthrough
Park's breakthrough came with the 2010 drama Sungkyunkwan Scandal, a coming-of-age drama in which her character, an intelligent and resourceful young woman, disguises herself as a boy in order to enter the most prestigious learning institution in Joseon. This was followed in 2011 by another success with City Hunter, based on the titular Japanese manga. Park starred opposite Lee Min-ho in a story about a vigilante out for revenge and justice, and the secret service agent he falls for. Park's success on the small screen resulted in increased advertising offers for the actress.

Later that year, she made her big screen debut in the horror film The Cat, about a woman who becomes consumed by fear after she adopts a cat found at the site of a mysterious death. Park next appeared in the melodrama Glory Jane, in the role of a nurse's aide who becomes involved with a former baseball player (played by Chun Jung-myung).

2012–present: Leading roles
Park starred in another manga screen adaptation in 2012; in Dr. Jin, a neurosurgeon (played by Song Seung-heon) travels back in time to 1860. Park played dual roles as the protagonist's girlfriend in the present-day (a comatose doctor), and her doppelgänger in the Joseon era (a sheltered noblewoman).

In May 2013, Park Min Young ended her contract with the previous management company King Kong Entertainment and was a free agent for six months. In November 2013, Park signed with new management agency Culture Depot.

She next played an idealistic intern in the legal drama A New Leaf (2014), who clashes with her brilliant but cynical lawyer boss until he becomes an amnesiac (played by Kim Myung-min). This was followed by a role as a tabloid reporter in Healer, a series written by Song Ji-na that also starred Ji Chang-wook and Yoo Ji-tae. Healer was popular in China and resulted in increased recognition for Park.

Park next starred as a lawyer in the Korean drama Remember on SBS from late 2015 to early 2016, and played a Queen in the historical drama, Queen for Seven Days, which aired in 2017. In September 2017, It was confirmed that Park will be a fixed cast member in Netflix's variety show Busted!. In November 2017, it was reported that Park Min Young's contract with her agency Culture Depot expired. In December 2017, Park signed with new management agency Namoo Actors.

In 2018, Park was cast in her first romantic comedy drama What's Wrong with Secretary Kim alongside Park Seo-joon. The series was a ratings success, leading to increased popularity for Park. In October, Park held her first fan meeting since her debut 12 years ago titled My Day.

In 2019, Park starred in her second romantic comedy drama Her Private Life alongside Kim Jae-wook. Park played Seong Deok-mi who works as a curator at an art museum but spends her time outside of work as a passionate fangirl of idol groups.

In 2020, she starred in the JTBC romance drama When the Weather Is Fine alongside Seo Kang-joon.

On December 29, 2021, it was announced that Park's contract with Namoo Actors has expired after she decided not to renew it. A day later, it was announced that Park has signed with Hook Entertainment.

In 2022, Park starred in the JTBC romance drama Forecasting Love and Weather alongside Song Kang, playing Jin Ha-kyung – a general forecaster at Korea Meteorological Administration.

Personal life

‎Philanthropy 
On March 7, 2022, Park donated 100 million won to the Hope Bridge Disaster Relief Association to help the victims of the massive wildfire that started in Uljin, Gyeongbuk and has spread to Samcheok, Gangwon.

Filmography

Film

Television series

Hosting

Web shows

Music video appearances

Awards and nominations

Other accolades

Listicles

Notes

References

External links 

 
 

South Korean television actresses
South Korean film actresses
21st-century South Korean actresses
Dongguk University alumni
Actresses from Seoul
1986 births
Living people